INC Architecture and Design, PLLC (INC) is an architecture and design studio based in New York City. Notable projects include 1 Hotel Brooklyn Bridge, The Line Hotel DC, and the TWA Hotel. The firm originally operated under the name "Incorporated Architecture and Design," until becoming INC [Architecture and Design] in 2017. The name INC is an acronym, using Latin terms to represent this tripartite leadership and their unique roles within the team, and three aspects vital to design: Iucunditas, for joy; Necessarius, for utility; and Creo, for craft.

Notable Projects
TWA Hotel (at the TWA Flight Center), Queens NY
1 Hotel Brooklyn Bridge Park, Brooklyn NY
The Line Hotel DC, Washington DC
Momofuku Noodle Bar (at the Time Warner Center), New York NY
121 East 22nd Street, New York NY
Equinox DUMBO, Brooklyn NY
Equinox Williamsburg, Brooklyn NY
The Sutton Condominium, New York NY
Parlour Condominium, Brooklyn NY
The Vandewater, Morningside Heights, New York NY

Recognitions

 2017 HD Awards: Winner, 1 Hotel Brooklyn Bridge Park (Sustainability) 
 2017 NYCxDESIGN Awards: Winner, Equinox DUMBO (Health and Wellness); Finalist, The Sutton (Residential Lobby/Amenity Space) 
 2017 Interior Design Best of Year Awards: Winner, 1 Hotel Brooklyn Bridge (Domestic Boutique Hotel)
 2018 NYCxDESIGN Awards: Finalist, 18th Street Triplex; Winner, 1 Hotel Brooklyn Bridge (Hotel).
 2018 AHEAD Awards: Winner, 1 Hotel Brooklyn Bridge (Hotel Newbuild) 
 2018 Best of Year Awards: Finalist, 18th Street Triplex (Mid-Size Apartment); Winner, The Line DC (Hotel Transformation) 
 2019 Architizer A+ Awards: Finalist, Parlour (Residential Unbuilt, Multi-Unit Housing) 
 2019 NYCxDESIGN Awards: Winner, Momofuku Noodle Bar, Columbus Circle (Restaurant); Winner, INC Studio (Firm's Own Office) 
 2019 DNA Paris Awards: Winner, Vandewater (Architecture: Housing) 
 2019 Interior Design NYC PowerGrid 100: Ranked #17
 2019 Best of Year Awards: Finalist, INC Studio (Firm's Own Office). Finalist, Frank Chair (Residential Accent Chair). Winner, TWA Hotel (Hotel Transformation).

References

External links
INC Architecture and Design: Official Website

Architecture firms based in New York City
2006 establishments in New York City